Georgy Ivakin (25 August 1928 – 1991) was a Soviet middle-distance runner. He competed in the men's 800 metres at the 1952 Summer Olympics.

References

1928 births
1991 deaths
Athletes (track and field) at the 1952 Summer Olympics
Soviet male middle-distance runners
Olympic athletes of the Soviet Union
Place of birth missing